Kněždub is a municipality and village in Hodonín District in the South Moravian Region of the Czech Republic. It has about 1,100 inhabitants.

Notable people
Joža Uprka (1861–1940), painter
František Uprka (1868–1929), sculptor
Antoš Frolka (1877–1935), painter

References

Villages in Hodonín District
Moravian Slovakia